Black Diamonds is the debut EP by American metalcore band Issues released on November 13, 2012.

Background
The majority of the band's members originated from ex-members of Woe, Is Me, being Tyler Carter, Michael Bohn, Cory Ferris and Ben Ferris. After they left their previous band, they recorded and released this debut EP. Later in 2014, Josh Manuel replaced Case Snedecor on drums, moving on to record the full titled Issues album. The lead single, titled "King of Amarillo," was released on October 2, 2012, along with a lyric video.

Critical reception

AbsolutePunk stated that the sound of the album was very similar to Woe, Is Me's album  Number[s], although it had a 'twist', praising Tyler Carter's vocal ability, although called the rapping in the songs 'sour'.

Track listing

Personnel
Issues
 Tyler Carter - clean vocals
 Michael Bohn - unclean vocals
 AJ Rebollo - guitars
 Cory Ferris – bass (credited but didn't compose or record anything on the album)
 Case Snedecor  - drums, percussion

Additional musicians
 Skyler Acord - bass
 Tyler "Scout" Acord - keyboards, synthesizers, programming, turntables
 Snow Tha Product - additional vocals on "Embrace Your Issue"

Production
Produced by Kris Crummett at Interlace Studios in Portland, Oregon

References

External links

Black Diamonds at YouTube (streamed copy where licensed)

2012 debut EPs
Issues (band) albums
Rise Records EPs
Albums produced by Kris Crummett